Maggie and the Ferocious Beast is a Canadian animated children's television series created by Michael and Betty Paraskevas. The program was based on the 1996 book The Ferocious Beast with the Polka-Dot Hide and its sequels. The series originally aired on Teletoon in Canada.

Series overview

Shorts (1998)

Episodes

Season 1 (2000)

Season 2 (2001)

Season 3 (2002)

References

Lists of Canadian children's animated television series episodes